Polygrammodes cuneatalis is a moth in the family Crambidae. It was described by Paul Dognin in 1908. It is found in Peru.

References

Spilomelinae
Moths described in 1908
Moths of South America